The 2009 Jelajah Malaysia, a cycling stage race that took place in Malaysia. It was held from 19 to 26 April 2009. There were eight stages with a total of 1,256.8 kilometres. In fact, the race was sanctioned by the Union Cycliste Internationale as a 2.2 category race and was part of the 2008–09 UCI Asia Tour calendar.

Timothy Roe of Australia won the race, followed by Jai Crawford of Australia second and Ghader Mizbani of Iran third overall. Anuar Manan of Malaysia won the points classification and Abbas Saeiditanha of Iran won the mountains classification.  won the team classification.

Stages

Classification leadership

Final standings

General classification

Points classification

Mountains classification

Malaysian rider classification

Team classification

Malaysian team classification

Stage results

Stage 1
19 April 2009 — Kuala Selangor to Ipoh,

Stage 2
20 April 2009 — Ipoh to Sungai Petani,

Stage 3
21 April 2009 — Gerik to Tanah Merah,

Stage 4
22 April 2009 — Pasir Mas to Kuala Terengganu,

Stage 5
23 April 2009 — Kuala Terengganu to Kuantan,

Stage 6
24 April 2009 — Gambang to Bera,

Stage 7
25 April 2009 — Tanjung Malim to Genting Highlands,

Stage 8
26 April 2009 — Kuala Lumpur Criterium

List of teams and riders
A total of 21 teams were invited to participate in the 2009 Jelajah Malaysia. Out of 122 riders, a total of 97 riders made it to the finish in Kuala Lumpur.

  Andrey Mizurov
  Ghader Mizbani
  Hossein Askari
  Mehdi Sohrabi
  Samad Pourseyedi
  Hossein Jahanbanian

  Matthew Rice
  Bernard Van Ulden
  Kel Reijnen
  Charles Huff
  Matthew Crane
  Will Routley

  Ng Yong Li
  Mohd Razif Mohd Salleh
  Low Ji Wen
  Tonton Susanto
  Samai Samai
  Jeremy Yates

  Ahmad Haidar Anuawar
  Loh Sea Keong
  Genta Nakamura
  James Spragg
  Eric Van de Meent
  Xing Yandong
Savings & Loans Cycling Team
  Jai Crawford
  David Pell
  Timothy Roe
  Steve Robb
  Will Dickeson
  Joel Pearson

  Lai Kuan-Hua
  Peng Kuei-Hsiang
  Chiang Chun-Te
  Huang Yen-Lin
  Chang Wei-Yi
Polygon Sweet Nice
  Serguei Kudentsov
  Hari Fitrianto
  Herwin Jaya
  Artemiy Timofeev
  Artyom Golovaschenko
  Kiril Kavantsev
Shimano Racing Team
  Shinri Suzuki
  Hidenori Nodera
  Tomoya Kano
  Yusuke Hatanaka
  Yoshinori Iino
  Suzuki Yuzuru

  Amir Zargari
  Abbas Saeiditanha
  Hossein Nateghi
  Evgeny Vakker
  Anuar Manan
  Hamid Shiriseysan
Malaysian Armed Forces Cycling Team
  Mohd Nor Rizuan Zainal
  Mohamed Zamri Salleh
  Mohd Shafrul Afiza Fauzian
  Muhamad Hazwan Azeman
  Amirul Aswandi Imran
  Mohd Fadhli Anwar Fauzi

Malaysia
  Suhardi Hassan
  Mohd Faris Abdul Razak
  Muhammad Fauzan Ahmad Lutfi
  Muhamad Rauf Nur Misbah
  Ahmad Fallanie Ali
  Wan Mohd Najmee Wan Mohd
Thailand
  Prajak Mahawong
  Jatupoom Lekawat
  Phanupan Koolrungrueangkit
  Thurakit Boonratanathanakorn
  Nattaphon Jeebtahwora
  Phucong Sai-Udomsin
Terengganu Toshiba Bike Labz
  Mohd Jasmin Roslan
  Mohamed Harrif Salleh
  Mohd Saiful Anuar Aziz
  Mohd Nur Umardi Rosli
  Mohd Saufi Mat Senan
  Mohd Shahrul Mat Amin
  Iman Firdaus Nasiruddin
Indonesia
  Parno
  Edi Purnomo
  Iwan Setyawan
  Heksa Priya Prasetya
  Rastra Patria
Doha Cycling Team
  Ezzedine Lagab
  Farid Belhani
  Aymen Ben Hassine
  Rafaâ Chtioui
  Abdelmalek Madani
  Fadi Shekhoni

Aisan Racing Team
  Takaeaki Ayabe
  Kenichi Suzuki
  Takumi Beppu
  Taiji Nishitani
  Masahiro Shinagawa
  Kazuhiro Mori

  Makoto Iijima
  Masamichi Yamamoto
  Masaru Fukuhara
  Sho Aikawa
  Shinpei Fukuda
  Yoshiaki Shimada
Tinelli Colossi Cycling Team
  Lars Pria
  Brad Hall
  David Ayre
  Nathan Dahlberg
  Michael Naylor
  James Langedyk
Team Jazysports Beacon Philippines
  Renato Sambrano
  Ericson Obosa
  Emelito Atilano
  Irish Valenzuela
  Sherwin Carrera
  Merculio Ramos Jr.
MNCF Continental Team
  Mohammad Akmal Amrun
  Amir Rusli
  Thum Weng Kin
  Muhamad Firdaus Daud
  Sarham Miswan
  Muhammad Zamani Mustarudin
Ride Sport Racing
  Kris Koke
  Deon Locke
  Scott Lyttle
  David McCann
  Shaun McCarthy
  Trent Stevenson

External links
 
 Palmares at cyclingarchives.com
 Results at cqranking.com

Jelajah Malaysia
Jelajah Malaysia
Jelajah Malaysia, 2009